General (Ret.) Djoko Santoso (8 September 1952 – 10 May 2020) was an Indonesian army officer. He was Chief of Staff of the Indonesian Army from 2005 to 2007. He was then appointed as the Commander of the Indonesian National Armed Forces, in which office he served from 2007 until his retirement in 2010.

In his retirement, he joined the Great Indonesia Movement Party.

He died in the Gatot Soebroto Army Hospital on 10 May 2020 due to a stroke.

References

External links
Archive of Biography on tokohindonesia.com (Indonesian)

|-

|-

1952 births
2020 deaths
People from Surakarta
Indonesian generals
Badminton in Indonesia
Chiefs of Staff of the Indonesian Army
Commanders of the Indonesian National Armed Forces
Recipients of the Darjah Utama Bakti Cemerlang (Tentera)